Durdans Hospital is a multi-speciality private hospital that treats patients visiting from around the world, in Colombo, Sri Lanka, founded in 1945, and currently owned and operated by Ceylon Hospitals PLC.

History

Early Years
Durdans Hospital was established in 1939. Originally the stately home of Charles Peiris, the brother of Sir James Peiris, it became the primary military hospital in British Ceylon. Its primary purpose was to treat British personnel during World War II. In 1945, a group of doctors seeking a private enterprise gained ownership of the hospital to establish Ceylon Hospitals Limited, the predecessor of modern-day Durdans Hospital.

Timeline of Development
 1968 - Durdans opened its first maternity care facility as well as an outpatient facility with a focus on maternity care.
 1982 - Paediatric care and surgical procedures commenced followed by more specialties being offered.
 1984 - Radiology Unit is opened to the public.
 1993 - Intensive Care Unit is opened.
 1995 - Setting up of the Endoscopy Unit.
 1996 - Pathology Laboratory and Blood bank is opened.
 1997 - Setting up of the Durdans Heart Centre
 1999 - The Alfred Place wing expanded to add more rooms.
 2003 - Ceylon Hospitals Limited listed on the Colombo Stock Exchange and company name changed to Ceylon Hospitals PLC.
 2004 - A phased expansion program commenced to improve Alfred Place Wing.
 2007 - The commencement of the construction of Sixth Lane Wing Hospital.
 2011 - Sixth Lane Wing Hospital became fully operational.
 2014 - Accredited by the Joint Commission International (JCI)(1st JCI Accredited Hospital in Sri Lanka) - Gold Seal of Approval.
 2014 - Liaison office is opened in the Maldives.
 2017 - Radiology Department updated with state of the art equipment and Laboratory operations re-accredited with ISO 15189:2012.
 2017 - Relaunch of Durdans brand with slogan 'Dedicated to you'. Opening of brand-new multi-storied split level car park.
2019 - Launch of most advanced biplane catheterisation  laboratory in Sri Lanka enabling head-to-toe procedures.
2020 - Digitisation of medical services and introduction of audio/video consultations.

Locations

Durdans Hospital – Sri Lanka
Durdans Hospital is located in the heart of the commercial capital of Colombo.

Durdans Laboratory
The Durdans laboratory network is spread over 100 locations that includes mini laboratories, sample collection centers, and medical centers across Sri Lanka.

Durdans Hospital – Maldives
In October 2014, Durdans Hospital opened a liaison office in the Maldives.

Durdans Heart Centre

Durdans Hospital established its Durdans Heart Centre in 1999. It has become a centre in cardiology, cardiac surgery and cardiac investigative procedures.

Durdans Heart Centre was established as an affiliation to Fortis Escorts Heart Institute (formally known as Escorts Heart Institute & Research Centre). It specialises in prevention, detection, diagnosis, and treatment of heart disease.

Medical Tourism 
Durdans is part of the drive to build a 2015–20 National Masterplan Initiative on Medical Tourism. This would map out such factors as availability of hospital facilities, accreditation, specialisations, centre of excellence areas, post-surgery and wellness packages, medical tourism packages and tie-ups with global medical travel agents.

Service Accessibility  
The hospital has introduced audio and video consultation to expand its service through telemedicine for patients since 2020.

Subsidiaries 
Amrak Institute of Medical Sciences is the training body of Durdans Hospital.

References

Private hospitals in Sri Lanka
Hospitals established in 1945
1945 establishments in Ceylon
Hospitals in Colombo
Ceylon in World War II
Companies listed on the Colombo Stock Exchange